Xiaguan District was an administrative district within the city of Nanjing, in Jiangsu province, China.

See also
 Zhongshan Wharf

References
www.xzqh.org 

County-level divisions of Jiangsu
Districts of Nanjing
1955 establishments in China